Tilt to Live is an action game for iPhone, iPad and iPod Touch devices, developed by American studio One Man Left and released on February 24, 2010. A sequel entitled Tilt to Live 2: Redonkulous was released on Nov 13, 2013, while Tilt to Live: Gauntlet's Revenge was released on Oct 23, 2014.

Gameplay
In a closed area, the player controls an arrow directed by tilting the device. The goal is to avoid to touch the red bubbles which appear and move in the area. The player can clean the area by using several types of weapons which randomly appear on the battlefield (Bubble Shield, Electricity, Fire Burnicade, Ice Blast, Spike Shield and Vortex). In destroying several red bubbles in a row, the player builds a combo in purpose to increase their score and beat their own high score.

Critical reception

Tilt to Live
Tilt to Live has a rating of 90% on Metacritic based on 9 critic reviews.

No DPad said " The controls in Tilt to Live are flawless and I had no problems performing the incredibly precise movements the game requires." Modojo said " Tilt to Live is without question one of the most polished and fun iPhone games we've played in months. For two bucks, there's no reason why you shouldn't download it ASAP. " TouchArcade said " Tilt to Live is a game that draws you in with its edgy personality and inescapable 'just one more go' gameplay. "AppSpy described it as " A well polished delight, that any fan of pick up and play games will enjoy. " TouchGen said " This game is getting a game of the year recommendation from me, as it's a great game. Right now the only thing stopping it from getting five stars is the lack of intuitive help screen and only one game mode. " 148Apps said it was " An exceptionally well designed, visually pleasing and frantically challenging action title. " GamePro wrote " I especially appreciate the numerous calibration option that the game offers—finally, I have a game that I can play while attempting to accomplish a full 360 degree orbit on a swing set. " Slidetoplay said " While we don't think you have to Buy To Live, you should definitely Buy To Be Entertained For A While. " Pocket Gamer UK described the game as " A shallow and fun arcade action game with plenty of attitude to fill in the gaps. "

Tilt to Live 2: Redonkulous
Tilt to Live 2: Redonkulous has a rating of 83% on Metacritic based on 9 critic reviews.

AppSpy said " Tilt to Live 2 is bigger, better - and yes, even more 'redonkulous' - than its excellent predecessor. " 148apps said " Tilt to Live 2 takes everything that was great about the original Tilt to Live and makes it feel fresh by presenting so many new ways for players to try and defeat the dot menace. " Multiplayer.it said " With some new features that add fresh content without altering the core mechanics, Tilt to Live 2: Redonkulos is an addictive action game suited for both fans of the prequel and newcomers." MacLife wrote " Take Redonkulous lightly at your peril – the gameplay here is hardcore with a vengeance. " Gamezebo said " Tilt to Live 2: Redonkulous is just as much fun as its predecessor, and that’s all you need to know. If you’re looking for tilty, frantic, arcade fun – just like the first game – this is a must buy. " Digital Spy wrote " While the core of Tilt to Live 2: Redonkulous remains unchanged from the original, the sequel refines the formula to rekindle the addiction all over again. "  Modojo said " A very good sequel to a pretty slick original, in other words. " Pocket Gamer UK said " By sticking to its core dot-dodging components while simultaneously refreshing its riotous arsenal, Tilt to Live 2: Redonkulous proves a fine complement to the original ". Slide To play Wrote " Tilt To Live 2 is a slight improvement on the high-quality original, but it's well short of redonkulous. "

Tilt to Live: Gauntlet's Revenge
Tilt to Live: Gauntlet's Revenge has a Metacritic rating of 78% based on four critic reviews.

References

External links
 

2010 video games
Action video games
Android (operating system) games
IOS games
Accelerometer-based mobile games
Video games developed in the United States